Ana Theresia Navarro Hontiveros-Baraquel (born February 24, 1966) is a Filipino politician, community leader, and journalist who has been serving as a senator of the Philippines since 2016. She previously served as a party-list representative for Akbayan from 2004 to 2010. She is the de facto leader of the opposition to the administration of President Bongbong Marcos, following the end of Vice President Leni Robredo's term.

She is a proponent of the SOGIE Equality Bill and an opposition figure to President Rodrigo Duterte, particularly on his controversial war on drugs. She is the older sister of journalists and television hosts Ginggay and Pia Hontiveros.

Early life 
Hontiveros was born on February 24, 1966, in Manila. At age 14, she was part of Repertory Philippines' adaptation of The Sound of Music as one of the Von Trapp children along with Lea Salonga, Monique Wilson, and Raymond Lauchengco. It was also during this period when she was first introduced to activist pursuit as an organizer in her high school in the campaign against the Bataan Nuclear Power Plant. Hontiveros graduated cum laude with a Bachelor of Arts degree in social sciences from the Ateneo de Manila University. While at Ateneo, she was active in the student council, where she participated in advocacies for peace and justice in marginalized communities.

She was also a television journalist and news anchor, having worked for two television networks in the country, IBC (Headline Trese) and GMA Network (GMA Network News).

Political career

House of Representatives 
Hontiveros first entered politics as the third nominee of the Party-list in the 2004 national elections. She was one of the prominent opposition figures of the Gloria Macapagal Arroyo administration, especially during the height of the Hello Garci controversy of 2005. On the International Women's Day of 2006, she was arrested and brought to Camp Caringal in Quezon City without a warrant despite the peaceful nature of the assembly marking the global event.

Senate bids

Running under the ticket of then-senator Benigno Aquino III, Hontiveros lost in the 2010 national elections.

Running under the Team PNoy ticket, Hontiveros ran again for a Senate seat in the 2013 midterm election. However, she lost for the second time, placing 17th in the Senate race. Her campaign slogan was Paglalaban ka, aalagaan ka which reflected the gains from enacting the Reproductive Health Law and the continuing struggle for universal health care and good governance. In the aftermath, Hontiveros acknowledged Senator Osmena's observation of her mixed messages in the campaign may have been the reason for her loss.

In December 2014, Hontiveros was inducted as a trustee of the Philippine Health Insurance Corporation board.

Senate

Hontiveros ran again for senator and won in the 2016 election under the Koalisyon ng Daang Matuwid of President Benigno Aquino III. Landing ninth place, she was proclaimed a senator-elect by the Philippine Commission on Elections, sitting en banc as the National Board of Canvassers, on May 19, 2016.

In November 2016, Hontiveros, along with hundreds of progressive groups, protested the sudden burial of the late dictator Ferdinand Marcos in the Libingan ng mga Bayani.

Hontiveros authored Senate Bill No. 1345, or the Philippine Mental Health Bill, which aims to create a mental health law for the Philippines by integrating mental health care services and programs into the nation's public health system and ensuring its availability in all hospitals nationwide. The bill was filed on February 17, 2017, and passed the Senate on May 2.

A staunch activist against the re-imposition of the death penalty, Hontiveros, along with key senators, announced in February 2017 that they would block any attempt to legislate such a law after the lower house of congress passed their version of the bill. On August 16, the shooting of Kian delos Santos occurred. Hontiveros is a consistent figure against the deadly Philippine Drug War, which has killed at least 20,000 as claimed by Senator Antonio Trillanes. She was one of the main initiators of a Senate investigation against the police personnel that killed Delos Santos. She also took legal custody of the case witnesses, with proper written consent from the minor and their parents, after fears of police retaliation against the witness surfaced.

Hontiveros was the principal author and sponsor of Republic Act No. 10932, or the "Act strengthening the Anti-Hospital Deposit Law", which increases the penalties for hospitals that demand deposits or advance payments before administering basic emergency services.

In September 2017, Hontiveros caught justice secretary Vitaliano Aguirre II drafting fabricated charges against her through text messages during a hearing on the deaths of minors caused by the Philippine Drug War. Aguirre's text messages instructed former Negros Oriental representative Jacinto Paras, a member of the controversial group VACC, to 'expedite' cases against Hontiveros, a sitting senator. Aguirre used the same tactic against Senator Leila de Lima, which led to de Lima's arrest a few months past. The revelation was protested nationwide as instead of focusing on the murder case, President Rodrigo Duterte's justice secretary was focusing on how to imprison Hontiveros. Despite being caught and the pieces of evidence presented in halls of the Senate, Aguirre still filed cases against Hontiveros in October. On September 13, 2017, Hontiveros, along with key senators, vowed to convince their House counterparts to restore the proposed P678-million budget of the Philippine Commission on Human Rights, which criticized Duterte's deadly drug war, for 2018. The House downgraded the commission's budget to only 1,000 pesos. The budget was eventually restored after major public and Senate appeals.

In December 2017, Hontiveros became one of the recipients of the first-ever Ripple Awards, which are given to 'brave individuals who have made a significant impact in spreading HIV-AIDS awareness, stopping the spread of the virus, and helping to fight the stigma suffered by their communities.' The production of fake news against Hontiveros has been continuous, propagating in numerous social media apps. Various fact-checking national news networks have aided in denouncing the proliferation of fake news. In May 2018, Hontiveros blasted the presidential palace for its 'sheepish response' to China's blatant intrusions and exploitation in the South China Sea and Benham Rise. On May 11, Hontiveros condemned the ouster of Chief Justice Maria Lourdes Sereno, calling it a 'stab to Constitution's heart'.

On August 16, 2018, a year after the murder of Kian delos Santos, Hontiveros filed a resolution seeking to declare every August 16 as a "National Day of Remembrance" for all the victims of extrajudicial killings (EJKs) under the Duterte government's war on drugs in commemoration of Kian delos Santos.

On September 20, 2018, Hontiveros slammed Duterte, calling him the "real destabilizer", after Duterte accused numerous progressive universities and Liberal opposition figures of an October destabilization plot that sought to oust him from office. When the alleged plot did not happen in October, Duterte afterward made the same accusations in November and December, despite both the military and the police force clearing all universities and Liberal opposition figures from the alleged ouster plot. On September 24, 2018, Hontiveros exposed the 2 billion pesos 'tara' system profit of military general Jason Aquino, who was appointed by Duterte as head of the country's National Food Authority. In October 2018, the proposed Safe Streets and Public Spaces Act of 2017, principally authored and sponsored by Hontiveros, passed in the Senate. The bill passed in the House in January 2019, and is awaiting a bicameral meeting for it to become a law.

In November 2018, Hontiveros received the Equality Champion Award from Lagablab Network for her push for equality laws in the Senate and her fight against SOGIE-based discrimination in the country. In the same month, Hontiveros reiterated that the influx of illegal Chinese workers in the Philippines is an 'assault on sovereignty and economy'. Hontiveros has also appeared numerous times for government to 'stop normalizing rape, sexual abuse amidst Duterte's sexually provocative remarks and tirades that objectify women and LGBTs.

In January 2019, Republic Act 11166, or the HIV and AIDS Policy Act of 2018 passed into law. Hontiveros was the principal author and sponsor of the law in the Senate. The new HIV law aids in expanding access to evidence-based HIV strategies and facilitates easier access to learning about one's HIV status. The passage of the law was lauded by the World Health Organization. In the same month, Hontiveros filed the divorce bill in the Senate. The majority of Filipinos support the proposed divorce bill.

Hontiveros was a key opposition figure against lowering the minimum age of criminality, which Duterte initially wanted to be nine years of age. She was awarded the Silver Rose Award by SOLIDAR, a European network of Civil Society Organizations (CSOs), at the European Parliament in Brussels, Belgium on January 29 in recognition of her contributions "to social justice and solidarity." Hontiveros was cited as "a progressive politician who is fighting for ideals and freedom in the Philippines."

On July 19, 2019, the PNP–Criminal Investigation and Detection Group (CIDG) filed charges against Hontiveros and other members of the opposition for "sedition, cyber libel, libel, estafa, harboring a criminal, and obstruction of justice". On February 10, 2020, she was cleared of all charges.

She urged an investigation of Chinese men's illegal activities, including prostitution, in a casino at Clark. Hontiveros also called for an independent investigation of the murder of Anakpawis chairman Randall Echanis. On August 18, 2020, Hontiveros urged the Department of Health to withdraw the memorandum that suspended the special risk allowance (SRA) of public health workers. She has backed the passage of the Magna Carta for Seafarers, as well as the establishment of more medical schools in state universities and colleges.

On August 26, 2020, Hontiveros again urged Duterte to speak out and lay down plans to protect the Philippines from China's aggression in the West Philippine Sea. On the same day, she also sought relief for the victims and the family of the victims of the Jolo bombings. She also urged the government to speed up the digital infrastructure support for MSME during the pandemic.

By the end of August, she urged the presidential palace to drop the Chinese firms involved in building military installations in the territories of the Philippines in the West Philippine Sea. On September 7, 2020, Hontiveros criticized Duterte's declaration of absolute pardon for the US Marine who has been convicted in the homicide of trans Filipina, Jennifer Laude, calling Duterte's move an "affront not only to the LGBTQI+ community but to the Filipino people."

Hontiveros sought re-election as a senator in the 2022 election under Team Robredo–Pangilinan, the main opposition ticket. She was also named as a guest candidate of the Labor and Ecology Advocates for Democracy (LEAD) senatorial slate of Leody de Guzman, another presidential candidate. She was successfully reelected for a second term, ranking 11th out of the 12 winning candidates with more than 15 million votes. She was projected to be the only opposition Senator in the 19th Congress. On June 27, she became the de facto leader of the opposition after she took her oath of office before outgoing Vice President Leni Robredo at the Quezon City Reception House.

During the 19th Congress, she became part of the two-member Senate minority bloc alongside Koko Pimentel, who was elected as Minority Floor Leader. On August 3, 2022, Pimentel named her as Senate Deputy Minority Leader.

Legislation
 Republic Act 9502 – Cheaper and Quality Medicines Law – significantly decreased the cost of quality medicines in the country.
 Republic Act 9700 – Comprehensive Agrarian Reform Program Extension With Reforms (CARPER) Law – improved the agrarian reform program of the government.
 Republic Act 10932 – Act Strengthening the Anti-Hospital Deposit Law – strengthened the penalties against hospitals who violate the Anti-Hospital Deposit Law.
 Republic Act 11036 – Philippine Mental Health Law – safeguards the mental health of Filipino citizens through education, medical advancements, and other support systems.
 Republic Act 11166 – HIV and AIDS Policy Act of 2018 – expands access to evidence-based HIV strategies and facilitates easier access to learning about one's HIV status.
 Republic Act 11313 – Safe Streets and Public Spaces Act – protects Filipinos (notably women) from catcalling, groping, persistent requests, and other forms of street harassment.

Personal life
Hontiveros's husband, Francisco Baraquel Jr., died in May 2005 after a heart attack due to severe asthma. They have four children together. Her nephew, Luis Hontiveros, was a housemate on the regular edition of Pinoy Big Brother: Lucky 7.

Having served as a journalist for ten years before venturing into politics, Hontiveros is a recipient of the Kapisanan ng Mga Broadkaster ng Pilipinas' Golden Dove Award for Best Female Newscaster. Because of her work in the peace talks with the National Democratic Front, she also received the Ten Outstanding Young Men (TOYM) Award for Peace and Advocacy in 2001 and a Nobel Peace Prize nomination in 2005.

Awards and recognition
 1994 Kapisanan ng mga Brodkaster ng Pilipinas Golden Dove Awards for Best Female Newscaster
 2001 Ten Outstanding Young Men (TOYM) Award for Peace and Advocacy
 2005 Nobel Peace Prize nomination
 2017 Love Gala Ripple Award for HIV-AIDS awareness
 2018 Lagablab Network Equality Champion Award
 2019 Silver Rose Award for social justice

References

External links 
 Senator Risa Hontiveros – Senate of the Philippines
 Official Facebook page
 Official Twitter account
 Official Volunteers for Risa Hontiveros website

1966 births
Living people
21st-century Filipino women politicians
21st-century Filipino politicians
Asian social liberals
Ateneo de Manila University alumni
Filipino activists
Filipino feminists
Filipino journalists
Filipino Roman Catholics
GMA Integrated News and Public Affairs people
Hiligaynon people
IBC News and Public Affairs people
Liberal Party (Philippines) politicians
Members of the House of Representatives of the Philippines for Akbayan
People from Quezon City
Politicians from Metro Manila
Senators of the 17th Congress of the Philippines
Senators of the 18th Congress of the Philippines
Women members of the Senate of the Philippines
Women members of the House of Representatives of the Philippines
Filipino stage actresses
Senators of the 19th Congress of the Philippines